The 41st Directors Guild of America Awards, honoring the outstanding directorial achievements in film and television in 1988, were presented on March 11, 1989 at the Beverly Hilton and the Plaza Hotel. The feature film nominees were announced on January 31, 1989.

Winners and nominees

Film

Television

Commercials

Robert B. Aldrich Service Award
 Gilbert Cates

Honorary Life Member
 Sidney Lumet

References

External links
 

Directors Guild of America Awards
1988 film awards
1988 television awards
Direct
Direct
Directors
1989 in Los Angeles
1989 in New York City
March 1989 events in the United States